There are around 7 large dams in Parner taluka of Ahmednagar district of state of Maharashtra.

Dams in Parner taluka by specifications-
The Table below list dams of Parner taluka of Ahmednagar district in the Indian state of Maharashtra by their specifications.

References

 
Parner
Maharashtra-related lists